Pussy paws or pussypaws is a common name of several genera of flowering plants in the family Montiaceae:

 Cistanthe, genus of small, succulent flowering plants
 Calyptridium
 Lewisiopsis, genus of flowering plant